Aivars Drupass (1963–1999) was a Latvian football forward.

Playing career

At the age of 18 the talented forward who was previously coached by Latvian footballer Gunārs Ulmanis joined FK Daugava Rīga. In his first season for Daugava he played in just one game. Since he had to join the army, for several years Drupass played in army clubs – SKA Khabarovsk and CSKA Moscow but in 1986 he was back in Daugava (6 goals in 33 matches). In 1992, he played 2 games for FC Skonto, the Latvian champion. Drupass also made 4 international appearances for Latvia (including in the first international match for Latvia after regaining of independence). He died from a serious illness at the age of just 36 years.

Honours
 Latvian Champion (1):
1992

References

Latvian footballers
Soviet footballers
Daugava Rīga players
Skonto FC players
Latvia international footballers
1999 deaths
1963 births
PFC CSKA Moscow players
FC Karpaty Lviv players
Footballers from Riga
Association football forwards
FC SKA-Khabarovsk players